Snefrid Eriksmoen (20 August 1894 – 25 May 1954) was a Norwegian politician for the Conservative Party.

She was born in Brandval.

She served as a deputy representative to the Norwegian Parliament from Buskerud during the terms 1945–1949 and 1950–1953. During the second term, for some months in 1949, she met as a regular representative, replacing Gudbrand Bernhardsen Tandberg who died.

Eriksmoen was a member of Lier municipal council from 1936 to 1940.

References

1894 births
1954 deaths
Conservative Party (Norway) politicians
Members of the Storting
Buskerud politicians
Women members of the Storting
20th-century Norwegian women politicians
20th-century Norwegian politicians